Desert Hills High School (DHHS) is a public charter high school in Gilbert, Arizona. It is operated by The Leona Group, which also operates other charter schools in Arizona, Florida, Ohio and Michigan.

As of 2012 Desert Hills inducted the National Business Honor Society program. It is the first charter school in the state to do so.

References

Public high schools in Arizona
The Leona Group
Charter schools in Arizona
Schools in Maricopa County, Arizona